The ADAM Automated Delivery of Alerts on Missing Children Program, commonly known as the ADAM Program, is an alert system that is used to help recover missing children throughout the United States. The National Center for Missing & Exploited Children (NCMEC) and LexisNexis® Risk Solutions partnered to develop the program, which has been operating since 2000.

The ADAM Program uses technology to distribute a poster with a photo and information about a missing child to targeted recipients ⸺ including members of law enforcement, news media, schools, businesses, medical centers and individuals within a specific geographic search area.

Program
NCMEC will make the determination whether to send a poster including a photo and information about the missing child through the ADAM Program. This process includes uploading the poster and selecting geographic area(s) that have been identified by law enforcement as the search target.  ADAM then distributes the poster by fax or email to law enforcement agencies, businesses and individuals who are located in the designated search area and have signed up to receive “ADAM alerts.”

In one instance, posters featuring a 16-year-old child who had gone missing were distributed through the ADAM Program. The very next day, NCMEC's 24-hour hotline (1-800-843-5678) received a call from a poster recipient who had seen the missing child at their place of business. Local law enforcement was notified and the child was safely recovered. Another recovery of two children ⸺ a 2- and 4- year old ⸺ occurred after it was reported that the children were eight states away from where they were last seen. A poster was sent out from a radius of the suspected city and NCMEC immediately received two leads from businesses where the children had been seen. The abductor also saw the poster and turned themselves into the police later that evening and the children were safely recovered.

Sign up for ADAM Alerts
In 2017, the ADAM Program was opened to allow individuals to sign up to receive missing child alerts at their personal email account. Today, anyone can sign up to receive missing children alerts at the ADAM Program website.

See also
 National Center for Missing & Exploited Children
 National Missing Children's Day
 John Walsh

External links
 ADAM Program
 National Center for Missing & Exploited Children
 LexisNexis Risk Solutions

References

 What You Can Do To Protect Kids On National Missing Children's Day

Emergency Alert System